Spilosoma nigrocincta is a moth in the family Erebidae. It was described by George Hamilton Kenrick in 1914. It is found in Madagascar.

Description
Head, thorax, and abdomen orange, antennae, palpi, and legs black, paired black spots on underside of the abdomen, the four middle segments on the upperside black in both sexes. Wings pale orange without marking.

Wingspan for the male 50 mm. and for the female 60 mm.

References

Spilosoma nigrocincta at Markku Savela's Lepidoptera and Some Other Life Forms

Moths described in 1914
nigrocincta